John Tatham, DD (Lincoln, 26 February 1670Oxford, 11 June 1731) was an Oxford college head in the 18th-century.

He graduated BA from Pembroke College, Oxford in 1689. He became a  Fellow of Lincoln College, Oxford in 1692. He was  Rector of Lincoln College, Oxford, from 1719 until his death. He also held the living at Scotton.

References

People from Lincoln, England
1670 births
1731 births
Alumni of Pembroke College, Oxford
Fellows of Lincoln College, Oxford
Rectors of Lincoln College, Oxford
17th-century English people
18th-century English Anglican priests